Kevin Nagy (born 11 September 1995 in Debrecen) is a Hungarian football player who currently plays for Mosonmagyaróvári TE.

Career

Debrecen
On 27 May 2017, Nagy played his first match for Debrecen in a 3-1 win against Diósgyőr in the Hungarian League.

Career statistics

Club

References

External links

1995 births
Living people
Sportspeople from Debrecen
Hungarian footballers
Association football wingers
Hajdúböszörményi TE footballers
Balmazújvárosi FC players
Debreceni VSC players
Szolnoki MÁV FC footballers
Mosonmagyaróvári TE 1904 footballers
Nemzeti Bajnokság I players
Nemzeti Bajnokság II players